Roccy FM (ACMA callsign: 2LFF) is an Australian radio station that transmits on 93.9 MHz FM  from Young, New South Wales, Australia and serves the towns in the South West Slopes region such as Cowra and Cootamundra.

History
Roccy FM was first broadcast as FM93.9 as supplementary FM radio station to sister station 2LF, before rebranding as Star FM. This lasted until mid-2008, when owners Macquarie Media Group purchased stations from Southern Cross Broadcasting, and was made to sell both Star FM and 2LF. It was purchased by Broadcast Operations Group, and was made to drop the Star FM branding.

After holding a competition to suggest new names for the station, the breakfast duo at that time, Daniel Sewart and Rick Knight, announced that Roccy FM had been selected after listeners voted on their favourite selection from a short list of entrants. Roccy is a backronym for Radio of Cowra Cootamundra and Young, the largest towns in the stations broadcast area.

Radio stations in New South Wales
Radio stations established in 2008
Broadcast Operations Group
Adult contemporary radio stations in Australia